Reijo is a Finnish male given name. There are more than 27,000 people with this name in Finland. More than half of them were born in the 1940s and 1950s. It originated as a variation of the Latin name Gregorius and the Greek name Gregorios, which are the equivalent of Gregory in English. The nameday is the 12th of March, the anniversary of the death of Pope Gregory I.

Some people who have this name include:

 Reijo Hakanen, Finnish ice hockey player
 Reijo Halme, Finnish sprinter
 Reijo Leppänen, Finnish ice hockey player
 Reijo Mäki, Finnish writer
 Reijo Mattinen, Finnish orienteering competitor
 Reijo Mikkolainen, Finnish ice hockey player
 Reijo Ruotsalainen, Finnish ice hockey player
 Reijo Ståhlberg, Finnish shot putter
 Reijo Tossavainen, Finnish politician
 Reijo Vähälä, Finnish high jumper

References 

Finnish masculine given names